The 9th Pan American Junior Athletics Championships were held in Havana, Cuba, on July 18–20, 1997.

Participation (unofficial)

Detailed result lists can be found on the "World Junior Athletics History" website.  An unofficial count yields the number of about 437 athletes from about 25 countries:  Argentina (11), Bahamas (14), Barbados (16), Brazil (31), Canada (40), Cayman Islands (4), Chile (10), Colombia (7), Costa Rica (2), Cuba (71), Dominican Republic (13), Ecuador (6), El Salvador (3), Guatemala (8), Guyana (2), Jamaica (41), Mexico (47), Panama (3), Paraguay (3), Peru (2), Puerto Rico (9), Trinidad and Tobago (7), United States (73), Uruguay (4), Venezuela (10).

Medal summary
Medal winners are published.
Complete results can be found on the "World Junior Athletics History" website.

Men

Women

Medal table (unofficial)

References

External links
World Junior Athletics History

Pan American U20 Athletics Championships
1997 in Cuban sport
Pan American U20 Championships
International athletics competitions hosted by Cuba
1997 in youth sport